Retrospective: The Music of Mad Men is a soundtrack album of television series Mad Men, released in 2015 by Republic Records in partnership with Lions Gate Entertainment.

Summary 
Each track on this album was featured in one or more episodes of the series. Along with songs popular in the 1960s, the album also features a song by The Decemberists, three songs performed by cast members (Christina Hendricks, Jessica Paré, and Robert Morse), two suites by Mad Men composer David Carbonara, and the main theme music by RJD2.

Track list

References

External links 
 

Mad Men
2015 soundtrack albums
Republic Records soundtracks